Maiyo is a surname of Kenyan origin. It also means "alcohol" in Kalenjin. Notable people with the surname include:

Benjamin Maiyo (born 1978), Kenyan long-distance track and road runner
Jonathan Maiyo (born 1988), Kenyan long-distance track and marathon runner
Maureen Jelagat Maiyo (born 1985), Kenyan 400 metres hurdler and 2012 Olympian
sammy k Maiyo-iten (born 1988), Kenyan HR Scholar

See also
Kimaiyo, related name meaning "boy born in the presence of alcohol"

Surnames of Kenyan origin
Kalenjin names